Saenklai Sit Kru Od was a Muaythai practitioner from Thailand. A two time Lumpinee Stadium champion and dominant fighter during the Muay Thai golden era in the 1990s.

Career
Saenklai started training in Muay Thai at the age of 11 following his brother Kangwannoi. He had his first fight after three months of training. Saenklai rapidly became a recognized talent in eastern Thailand where he faced future champions such as Robert Kaennorasing and Samson Isaan who he fought a total of 13 times along his career.

In 1988 Saenklai started fighting in the Bangkok area, at first mostly in Samrong Stadium until he reached 100 lbs. He then made his way permanently to Lumpinee Stadium where he fought for the Petchyindee promotion.

At the peak of his career, as a Lumpinee stadium champion his highest purse reached 250,000 baht.

On December 15, 2019, Saenklai passed away from tuberculosis complications at the age 46 in his home in Bua Yai District.

Titles and accomplishments 
Lumpinee Stadium
 1991 Lumpinee Stadium 118 lbs Champion
 1993 Lumpinee Stadium 118 lbs Champion (Defended six times)
World Muay Thai Council
 1995 WMTC World 122 lbs Champion

Muay Thai record

|-  style="background:#fbb;"
| 1997-|| Loss ||align=left| Jaoweha Looktapfah ||  ||  Thailand || KO  || 3 ||
|-  style="background:#fbb;"
| 1996-|| Loss ||align=left| Singdam Or.Ukrit || Omnoi Stadium - Isuzu Cup || Samut Sakhon, Thailand || Decision ||5  ||3:00
|-  style="background:#fbb;"
| 1996-|| Loss ||align=left| Anantasak Panyuthaphum || Omnoi Stadium - Isuzu Cup || Samut Sakhon, Thailand || Decision ||5  ||3:00
|-
! style=background:white colspan=9 |
|- style="background:#fbb;"
| 1996-09-21 || Loss ||align=left| Chutin Por.Tawatchai || Omnoi Stadium || Samut Sakhon, Thailand  || Decision || 5 || 3:00
|-  style="background:#cfc;"
| 1996-08-27|| Win ||align=left| Muangfahlek Kiatwichian || Lumpinee Stadium || Bangkok, Thailand || Decision || 5 || 3:00
|- style="background:#c5d2ea;"
| 1996-06-14 || Draw ||align=left| Namtaotong Sor.Sirikul || Lumpinee Stadium ||  Bangkok, Thailand  || Decision || 5 || 3:00
|- style="background:#fbb;"
| 1996-05-10 || Loss ||align=left| Changnoi Sirimongkol || Lumpinee Stadium ||  Bangkok, Thailand  || Decision || 5 || 3:00
|- style="background:#cfc;"
| 1996-02-02 || Win ||align=left| Phetnamnueng Por.Chatchai || Lumpinee Stadium ||  Bangkok, Thailand  || Decision || 5 || 3:00
|-
! style=background:white colspan=9 |
|- style="background:#cfc;"
| 1995-11-21 || Win ||align=left| Changnoi Sirimongkol ||  ||  Bangkok, Thailand  || Decision || 5 || 3:00
|-
! style=background:white colspan=9 |
|- style="background:#c5d2ea;"
| 1995-10-20 || Draw ||align=left| Phetnamnueng Por.Chatchai || Lumpinee Stadium ||  Bangkok, Thailand  || Decision || 5 || 3:00
|- style="background:#cfc;"
| 1995-09-19 || Win ||align=left| Noppadej Sakmuangklaeng ||  ||  Bangkok, Thailand  || Decision || 5 || 3:00
|- style="background:#cfc;"
| 1995-08-02 || Win ||align=left| Changnoi Sirimongkol ||  ||  Bangkok, Thailand  || Decision || 5 || 3:00
|-  style="background:#cfc;"
| 1995-07-19|| Win ||align=left| Muangfahlek Kiatwichian || Rajadamnern Stadium || Bangkok, Thailand || Decision || 5 || 3:00
|- style="background:#fbb;"
| 1995-05-09 || Loss ||align=left| Phetnamnueng Por.Chatchai || Lumpinee Stadium ||  Bangkok, Thailand  || Decision || 5 || 3:00
|-
! style=background:white colspan=9 |
|- style="background:#c5d2ea;"
| 1995-03-14 || Draw ||align=left| Phetnamnueng Por.Chatchai || Lumpinee Stadium ||  Bangkok, Thailand  || Decision || 5 || 3:00
|- style="background:#fbb;"
| 1995-02-17 || Loss ||align=left| Phetnamnueng Por.Chatchai || Lumpinee Stadium ||  Bangkok, Thailand  || Decision || 5 || 3:00
|-
! style=background:white colspan=9 |
|-  style="background:#cfc;"
| 1995-01-20|| Win ||align=left| Anantasak Panyuthaphum || Lumpinee Stadium || Bangkok, Thailand || Decision || 5 || 3:00 
|-
|- style="background:#fbb;"
| 1994-12-27 || Loss ||align=left| Changnoi Sirimongkol || Lumpinee Stadium ||  Bangkok, Thailand  || Decision || 5 || 3:00
|- style="background:#cfc;"
| 1994-11-25 || Win ||align=left| Dara-Ek Sitrungsap || Lumpinee Stadium ||  Bangkok, Thailand  || Decision || 5 || 3:00
|- style="background:#fbb;"
| 1994-09-23 || Loss ||align=left| Veeraphol Sahaprom || Lumpinee Stadium ||  Bangkok, Thailand  || Decision || 5 || 3:00
|-  style="background:#cfc;"
| 1994-08-05 || Win ||align=left| Singdam Or.Ukrit || Lumpinee Stadium || Bangkok, Thailand || Decision || 5 || 3:00 
|-
! style=background:white colspan=9 |
|- style="background:#cfc;"
| 1994-07-05 || Win ||align=left| Tuktathong Por.Pongsawang || Lumpinee Stadium ||  Bangkok, Thailand  || Decision || 5 || 3:00
|- style="background:#cfc;"
| 1994-06-07 || Win ||align=left| Dara-Ek Sitrungsap || Lumpinee Stadium ||  Bangkok, Thailand  || Decision || 5 || 3:00
|-
! style=background:white colspan=9 |
|- style="background:#c5d2ea;"
| 1994-05-20 || Draw ||align=left| Dara-Ek Sitrungsap || Lumpinee Stadium ||  Bangkok, Thailand  || Decision || 5 || 3:00
|-
! style=background:white colspan=9 |
|-  style="background:#cfc;"
| 1994-03-29 || Win ||align=left| Singdam Or.Ukrit || Lumpinee Stadium || Bangkok, Thailand || TKO (Right Cross) || 4 || 
|-
! style=background:white colspan=9 |
|-  style="background:#fbb;"
| 1994-02-18 || Loss ||align=left| Singdam Or.Ukrit || Lumpinee Stadium || Bangkok, Thailand || Decision  || 5 || 3:00
|-  style="background:#cfc;"
| 1994-01-25 || Win ||align=left| Samson Isaan || Lumpinee Stadium || Bangkok, Thailand || Decision  || 5 || 3:00
|-  style="background:#fbb;"
| 1994-01-08 || Loss ||align=left| Singdam Or.Ukrit || Lumpinee Stadium || Bangkok, Thailand || Decision  || 5 || 3:00
|-  style="background:#cfc;"
| 1993-12-07|| Win ||align=left| Anantasak Panyuthaphum || Lumpinee Stadium || Bangkok, Thailand || Decision || 5 || 3:00 
|-
! style=background:white colspan=9 |
|- style="background:#cfc;"
| 1993-11-05 || Win ||align=left| Jomhodlek Rattanachot || Lumpinee Stadium ||  Bangkok, Thailand  || Decision || 5 || 3:00
|-  style="background:#fbb;"
| 1993-10-15 || Loss ||align=left| Dokmaipa Por Pongsawang || Lumpinee Stadium || Bangkok, Thailand || Decision || 5 || 3:00
|- style="background:#cfc;"
| 1993-09-03 || Win ||align=left| Dara-Ek Sitrungsap || Lumpinee Stadium ||  Bangkok, Thailand  || Decision || 5 || 3:00
|- style="background:#cfc;"
| 1993-08-10 || Win ||align=left| Jomhodlek Rattanachot || Lumpinee Stadium ||  Bangkok, Thailand  || Decision || 5 || 3:00
|-
! style=background:white colspan=9 |
|- style="background:#fbb;"
| 1993-06-22 || Loss ||align=left| Jomhodlek Rattanachot || Lumpinee Stadium ||  Bangkok, Thailand  || Decision || 5 || 3:00
|- style="background:#cfc;"
| 1993-05-18 || Win ||align=left| Dara-Ek Sitrungsap || Lumpinee Stadium ||  Bangkok, Thailand  || Decision || 5 || 3:00
|- style="background:#cfc;"
| 1993-04-27 || Win ||align=left| Yodkhunpon Sittraiphum || Lumpinee Stadium ||  Bangkok, Thailand  || Decision || 5 || 3:00
|-
! style=background:white colspan=9 |
|-  style="background:#cfc;"
| 1993-04-02|| Win ||align=left| Anantasak Panyuthaphum || Lumpinee Stadium || Bangkok, Thailand || Decision || 5 || 3:00
|-  style="background:#cfc;"
| 1993-03-12 || Win ||align=left| Samson Isaan || Lumpinee Stadium || Bangkok, Thailand || Decision  || 5 || 3:00
|-  style="background:#cfc;"
| 1993-01-31 || Win ||align=left| Veeraphol Sahaprom || Rajadamnern Stadium || Bangkok, Thailand || Decision || 5 || 3:00
|-  style="background:#cfc;"
| 1992-12-25 || Win ||align=left| Veeraphol Sahaprom || Lumpinee Stadium || Bangkok, Thailand || Decision || 5 || 3:00
|-  style="background:#fbb;"
| 1992-12-08 || Loss ||align=left| Samson Isaan || Lumpinee Stadium || Bangkok, Thailand || Decision  || 5 || 3:00
|-  style="background:#cfc;"
| 1992-10-30 || Win ||align=left| Burklerk Pinsinchai || Lumpinee Stadium || Bangkok, Thailand || Decision || 5 ||3:00

|-  style="background:#fbb;"
| 1992-10-09 || Loss ||align=left| Changnoi Sirimongkol ||  || Bangkok, Thailand || Decision || 5 || 3:00

|-  style="background:#cfc;"
| 1992-08-28 || Win ||align=left| Jaroensak Kiatnakonchon || Lumpinee Stadium || Bangkok, Thailand || Decision || 5 || 3:00

|-  style="background:#cfc;"
| 1992-07-28 || Win ||align=left| Silapathai Jockygym || Lumpinee Stadium || Bangkok, Thailand || Decision || 5 || 3:00

|- style="background:#cfc;"
| 1992-06-26 || Win  ||align=left| Kiwmorakot Prayanan|| Lumpinee Stadium ||  Bangkok, Thailand  || Decision || 5 || 3:00

|- style="background:#fbb;"
| 1992-06-02 || Loss  ||align=left| Taweesaklek Ploysakda || Lumpinee Stadium ||  Bangkok, Thailand  || Decision || 5 || 3:00

|- style="background:#fbb;"
| 1992-03-31 || Loss  ||align=left| Yodkhunpon Sittraiphum || Lumpinee Stadium ||  Bangkok, Thailand  || Decision || 5 || 3:00
|-  style="background:#fbb;"
| 1992-03-06 || Loss||align=left| Singdam Or.Ukrit || Lumpinee Stadium || Bangkok, Thailand || Decision || 5 || 3:00

|-  style="background:#c5d2ea;"
| 1992-02-14 || Draw||align=left| Singdam Or.Ukrit || Lumpinee Stadium || Bangkok, Thailand || Decision || 5 || 3:00

|-  style="background:#cfc;"
| 1992-01-24 || Win ||align=left| Dentaksin Kiatrattaphon || Lumpinee Stadium || Bangkok, Thailand || KO || 1 || 
|-  style="background:#fbb;"
| 1991-11-29 || Loss ||align=left| Samson Isaan || Lumpinee Stadium || Bangkok, Thailand || KO (Spinning Elbow) || 2 || 
|-
! style=background:white colspan=9 |
|- style="background:#cfc;"
| 1991-10-29 || Win ||align=left| Yodkhunpon Sittraiphum || Lumpinee Stadium ||  Bangkok, Thailand  || Decision || 5 || 3:00
|-  style="background:#fbb;"
| 1991-09-20 || Loss ||align=left| Samson Isaan || Lumpinee Stadium || Bangkok, Thailand || Decision  || 5 || 3:00
|- style="background:#fbb;"
| 1991-08-23 || Loss ||align=left| Veeraphol Sahaprom || Lumpinee Stadium ||  Bangkok, Thailand  ||  Decision || 5 || 3:00
|-  style="background:#cfc;"
| 1991-08-02 || Win ||align=left| Taweesaklek Ploysakda || Lumpinee Stadium || Bangkok, Thailand || KO (Punches)|| 3 ||
|-  style="background:#cfc;"
| 1991-06-18 || Win ||align=left| Taweesaklek Ploysakda || Lumpinee Stadium || Bangkok, Thailand || Decision || 5 || 3:00 
|-
! style=background:white colspan=9 |

|-  style="background:#cfc;"
| 1991-04-26 || Win ||align=left| Panomrung Sitbanchong || Lumpinee Stadium || Bangkok, Thailand || Decision || 5 || 3:00
|-  style="background:#cfc;"
| 1991-03-19 || Win ||align=left| Jaroensak Kiatnakonchon || Lumpinee Stadium || Bangkok, Thailand || Decision || 5 || 3:00
|-  style="background:#cfc;"
| 1991-02-19 || Win ||align=left| Kaimthaew Sitkuan || Lumpinee Stadium || Bangkok, Thailand || Decision || 5 || 3:00
|-  style="background:#cfc;"
| 1991-01-18 || Win ||align=left| Pepsi Biyapan || Lumpinee Stadium || Bangkok, Thailand || Decision || 5 || 3:00
|- style="background:#fbb;"
| 1990-12-14 || Loss ||align=left| Dentaksin Kiatrattaphol  || Lumpinee Stadium ||  Bangkok, Thailand  ||  Decision || 5 || 3:00
|- style="background:#cfc;"
| 1990-11-23 || Win||align=left| Dentaksin Kiatrattaphol  || Lumpinee Stadium ||  Bangkok, Thailand  ||  Decision || 5 || 3:00
|- style="background:#cfc;"
| 1990-11-06 || Win ||align=left| Denthaksin Kiatrattaphol  || Lumpinee Stadium ||  Bangkok, Thailand  ||  Decision || 5 || 3:00
|-  style="background:#cfc;"
| 1990-10-19 || Win||align=left| Samson Isaan || Lumpinee Stadium || Bangkok, Thailand || Decision  || 5 || 3:00
|-  style="background:#cfc;"
| 1990-09-21 || Win||align=left| Samson Isaan || Lumpinee Stadium || Bangkok, Thailand || Decision  || 5 || 3:00
|- style="background:#cfc;"
| 1990-08-28 || Win||align=left| Somdet Sit Or || Lumpinee Stadium ||  Bangkok, Thailand  || Decision || 5 || 3:00
|- style="background:#cfc;"
| 1990-08-05 || Win||align=left| Chalong Silapakorn|| Lumpinee Stadium ||  Bangkok, Thailand  || Decision || 5 ||3:00  
|- style="background:#cfc;"
| 1990-06-22 || Win||align=left| Chalong Silapakorn|| Lumpinee Stadium ||  Bangkok, Thailand  || Decision || 5 ||3:00  
|- style="background:#cfc;"
| 1990-05-25 || Win||align=left| Chalong Silapakorn|| Lumpinee Stadium ||  Bangkok, Thailand  || Decision || 5 ||3:00  
|- style="background:#fbb;"
| 1990-03-23 || Loss ||align=left| Chalong Silapakorn|| Lumpinee Stadium ||  Bangkok, Thailand  || Decision || 5 ||3:00  
|- style="background:#cfc;"
| 1990-03-02 || Win ||align=left| Rattanachai Wor.Walapon  || Lumpinee Stadium ||  Bangkok, Thailand  ||  Decision || 5 || 3:00
|- style="background:#cfc;"
| 1990-02-12 || Win ||align=left| Yodawut Sor.Tossaphon  || Lumpinee Stadium ||  Bangkok, Thailand  ||  Decision || 5 || 3:00
|-
| colspan=9 | Legend:

References

1973 births
2019 deaths
Saenklai Sit Kru Od
Saenklai Sit Kru Od